Ranald Macdonald (18 January 1928 – 2 October 1999) was a Scotland international rugby union player who played for Edinburgh University. Normally a fly-half, he also played at centre and on the wing.

Rugby career

Amateur career

He played for Edinburgh University RFC at Fly-half, forming a successful half-back pairing with Edinburgh University's scrum half Gus Black.

Provincial career

He was capped for Edinburgh District while still at Edinburgh University. He played in the 1947 inter-city match against Glasgow District, scoring a try. He played in 2 December 1950 inter-city match against Glasgow District.

He played for Cities against Australia in 1947.

International career

He was capped for  four times in 1950, playing in the Five Nations tournament in every game. He was capped at Centre.

He was later capped for British and Irish Lions in the same year, and played on the Wing for the Lions. He scored two tries in games against Wanganui and Ceylon. He had two Lions test caps but played 14 times in total on the tour scoring 14 tries.

References

1928 births
1999 deaths
Scottish rugby union players
Scotland international rugby union players
Edinburgh University RFC players
British & Irish Lions rugby union players from Scotland
Edinburgh District (rugby union) players
Cities District players
Rugby union players from Consett
Rugby union centres